Larry L'Estrange MBE (12 November 1934 – 29 March 2007) was a British paratrooper and rugby player.

The son of a British diplomat, L'Estrange was born in Lytham St Annes in 1934 and was educated at Blackrock College, Dublin; the University of Chicago; and the Sorbonne in Paris. He undertook National Service, being deployed as part of the Parachute Regiment in Suez during the 1956 crisis. He was commissioned, reaching the rank of lieutenant colonel before returning to Ireland to study modern history and political science at the University of Dublin.

After his military career, L'Estrange played for London Irish, where he was awarded the 1963–64 Backs' Honours tie. He also made appearances for Sussex and the Territorial Army. He was capped once for Ireland in 1962, against England at Twickenham, where he was one of nine debutants. L'Estrange dislocated his finger during the match and was said to have had a 'ghastly' game.

His father, Lawrence L'Estrange, was the Ambassador of the United Kingdom to Honduras from 1969 to 1972.

In 1972, he was awarded the Member of the British Empire in the 1972 Birthday Honours.

In 1984, he made the news when he was mistakenly barred from entering Greece because he had a Turkish North Cyprus visa in his passport. After protesting to the Greek Embassy in London, he was given a full apology plus a return plane ticket and 2 weeks holiday in Greece for free. L'Estrange was a partner at Tustain and L'Estrange, Stockbrokers in the City of London and later became an insurance broker, working at Thorman Hunt & Co, in Bow, London. The company now sells wholesale alcoholic beverages.

L'Estrange died on 29 March 2007 after being hospitalized for a broken hip in Condom, Gers, France, aged 72.

References

1934 births
2007 deaths
Ireland international rugby union players
London Irish players
People educated at Blackrock College
Rugby union players from Lancashire